Lady Octopus (Carolyn Trainer), also known as Doctor Octopus II, is a supervillain appearing in American comic books published by Marvel Comics, primarily as an enemy to the superheroes Spider-Man and Scarlet Spider. The character is the protégée of Otto Octavius, the original Doctor Octopus, and assumes her mentor's mantle and an upgraded version of his tentacle harness following Octavius' death in the "Clone Saga". After Octavius' resurrection only a few years later, she becomes Lady Octopus to distinguish herself from him, and has made minor appearances in several stories since.

Publication history
Lady Octopus was introduced in The Amazing Spider-Man #406 (October 1995) and was created by writer J.M. DeMatteis and artist Angel Medina.

Fictional character biography
Carolyn Trainer is the daughter of Seward Trainer who was a student of Otto Octavius. After Octavius was killed by Kaine during the "Clone Saga", Carolyn sought to continue her favorite professor's legacy.

She obtained a set of a four-tentacle harness identical to Octavius's, which she upgraded by adding a force-field that protected her from any exterior attacks, but allowed her tentacles to freely go through. She took the "Doctor Octopus" name in honor of her beloved instructor and began a campaign to steal her father's research in merging reality and virtual reality.

When she found her father was being protected by Scarlet Spider, she became jealous of the father-son relationship between him and her father. She tried but failed to blackmail her way into gaining Trainer's data by stealing a serum that could cure a seriously ill Mary Jane Watson, resulting in her being beaten heavily by Spider-Man and revealing she was working for the mysterious Master Programmer.

Carolyn continued her efforts to merge reality and virtual reality, ending up in a technological gang war against Mr. Tso and his boss Alistair Smythe with the Scarlet Spider in the middle of it. She hired the Looter, Override and Aura, and the Pro to assist her in this, as well as Stunner (Octavius's lover/henchwoman), and eventually succeeded in defeating Smythe and gaining the technology she needed before the Scarlet Spider thwarted her.

The Master Programmer was revealed to be a digitized copy of Doctor Octopus' mind and Carolyn's overall plan had been to allow Master Programmer to exist in the real world, effectively resurrecting the original Doctor Octopus. This thwarted, she attempted to claim her father's then-comatose body and was finally captured by the police.

Later, she was involved in the resurrection of Doctor Octopus. The cult group known as The Hand, working for Rose, dug up Octavius' corpse and brought him back from the dead, albeit with large mental gaps. Carolyn injected him with all the data of the Master Programmer and returned the tentacles to him. She joined him as an assistant and faded into the background.

Carolyn Trainer made a small appearance in "Secret War". She now calls herself Lady Octopus to distinguish her from her mentor. She was given a new suit of armor by Lucia von Bardas and Tinkerer. She and Hobgoblin V were sent to assassinate Captain America, but were defeated. They regrouped to a dock where a small army of Tinkerer's clients where waiting (consisting of Boomerang, Constrictor, Crimson Dynamo IX, Crossfire, Eel II, Goldbug, Grim Reaper, King Cobra, Mentallo, Scorcher, Scorpion, Shocker, Spider-Slayer XIX, Trapster and Wizard). Lady Octopus fought Spider-Man and Captain America when the Fantastic Four join the battle. Just then, Lucia von Bardas activated the devices in the villains' suits linking them together to a giant bomb. After Daisy Johnson deactivated von Bardas, Lady Octopus and the other villains Lucia von Bardas manipulated were all hospitalized with severe injuries.

Lady Octopus has been hired by Walter Declun (a former member of Damage Control) to assist Absorbing Man, Hydro-Man, Killer Shrike, a Mandroid, Porcupine II, and Rock to defend him from Black Panther and the Fantastic Four after they uncovered his plot to destabilize all of Wakanda on Doctor Doom's behalf. Walter Declun also upgraded their technological equipment to perform the job.

Lady Octopus was later seen shortly before the Siege of Asgard when she went on a rampage in New York only to be defeated by Mockingbird and Ronin.

During the "Hunted" storyline, Lady Octopus is among the animal-themed superhumans that are captured by Taskmaster and Black Ant for Kraven the Hunter's Great Hunt which is sponsored by Arcade's company Arcade Industries.

Lady Octopus appears as a member of a female incarnation of the Sinister Syndicate. She asks Francine Frye if she is familiar with the concept of macrobiotics. Carolyn then mentioned to Janice Lincoln about the e-mail about the refrigerator where there is dairy products inside where she was planning an organic vegan cheeseburger night on Friday. The Sinister Syndicate begins their mission where they attack the F.E.A.S.T. building that Boomerang is volunteering at. Beetle leads the Sinister Syndicate in attacking Boomerang. It was stated by Boomerang that he was the one who came up with the Sinister Syndicate name. Lady Octopus stated that they dropped the "Sinister" part of the Sinister Syndicate's name. After getting Aunt May to safety, Peter Parker changes into Spider-Man and helps Boomerang fight the Syndicate. The Syndicate starts doing their formation until Spider-Man accidentally sets off Boomerang's gaserang which knocks out Spider-Man enough for the Syndicate to make off with Boomerang. When Beetle returns to the headquarters, Lady Octopus is present when Mayor Wilson Fisk brings the full force of New York City to their headquarters demanding that they surrender Boomerang to him. The Syndicate then assists Spider-Man against Mayor Fisk's forces. After Spider-Man evacuates Boomerang, the Syndicate fights Mayor Fisk's forces while not killing them. The Syndicate is defeated and arrested by the police. Their transport is then attacked by an unknown assailant who frees them.

During the "Sinister War" storyline, Lady Octopus was with the Sinister Syndicate when they are among the villains that Kindred sends to take down Spider-Man.

Powers and abilities

Lady Octopus possesses no superhuman abilities. Instead, she wears a special harness, similar to the one used by the original Doctor Octopus, which incorporates four strong and highly-resistant mechanical appendages, which can be extended or retracted at will. These "tentacles" can lift weights far greater than any human, be used as a means of transportation, and have superhumanly fast reaction time. They are also armed with lasers, and can generate a force-field around Lady Octopus; the result of upgrades she had made to the harness. The force-field is resistant to most traumatic concussive force and conventional weapons attack, but features one weakness: the tentacles themselves; something Scarlet Spider took advantage of with his impact webbing.

Through the tentacles, Lady Octopus seems able to interface with appropriately equipped computer systems and enter virtual-reality interfaces telepathically. Aside from her harness, Lady Octopus possesses a genius-level intellect, and studied robotics, information technology, applied physics, and mechanical engineering.

Reception
 In 2020, CBR.com ranked Lady Octopus 8th in their "10 Most Powerful Members of the Sinister Syndicate" list.
 In 2021, Screen Rant included Lady Octopus in their "Spider-Man: 10 Best Female Villains" list.

Other versions

MC2
In the MC2 alternate future series Spider-Girl, Carolyn Trainer returns to supervillainy years after Otto Octavius's death, initially reclaiming the 'Doctor Octopus' title. Intending to create mutate soldiers for the mob, she briefly turns John Jameson back into Man-Wolf, before beating Spider-Girl in a pitched battle. Later, she frees crime boss Canis from prison in the hope of uniting to take over the criminal underworld and oppose the Black Tarantula; it is later revealed that she is in fact working for the Tarantula, setting Canis up for a fall. Spider-Girl battles Carolyn once again and finally takes her down.

In other media

Television
 Lady Octopus appears in the Spider-Man episode "Between an Ock and a Hard Place", voiced by Kari Wahlgren. This version has a Ph.D in electronics, which she used to fake her criminal record and have herself put in a cell next to Doctor Octopus in superhuman prison, the Cellar, where he manipulates her into obtaining crystals for a modified neuro cortex device for mind enhancement. After Spider-Man defeats her, she learns she had been manipulated and seeks revenge. To achieve this, she and Spider-Man fight Doc Ock and put her former idol into a coma. Following the fight, she relinquishes her tentacle harness and leaves.
 A female Doctor Octopus loosely based on Carolyn Trainer appears in Spidey and His Amazing Friends, voiced by Kelly Ohanian. This version prefers to work in secret, plans complex schemes, and rarely fights Spider-Man.

Film
An alternate universe incarnation of Lady Octopus appears in Spider-Man: Into the Spider-Verse, voiced by Kathryn Hahn. This version is a gender-swapped Otto Octavius named Dr. Olivia "Liv" Octavius.

Video games
 A character inspired by Lady Octopus appears as a boss in Spider-Man: Shattered Dimensions, voiced by Tara Strong. Dr. Serena Patel of the year 2099 is the head scientist of Alchemax's Shadow Division, which is dedicated to the secretive creation of dangerous super-weapons and twisted experiments in DNA-splicing. Creating a battle suit with six high-tech mechanical arms and calling herself "Doctor Octopus" after her idol Dr. Otto Octavius, Patel uses her genius to create a new Hobgoblin with Alchemax's technology and manipulate the Scorpion into helping her. After Hobgoblin and Scorpion are defeated, she finds a fragment of the Tablet of Order and Chaos and uses it to build and power a condensed matter reactor to wreak havoc and take over the world. Upon being discovered by the Spider-Man 2099, she releases mutated creatures to kill him. However, he eventually defeats her, claiming the tablet fragment.
 Lady Octopus appears in a teaser image for season two of Marvel: Avengers Alliance as a victim of the Circle of Eight.

Miscellaneous
Lady Octopus appears in the Marvel Battleworld: Treachery at Twilight animated shorts based on the Marvel's Battleworld collectible game published by Funko.

References

External links
 
 Lady Octopus at Marvel Wiki
 Lady Octopus at Comic Vine
 
 Trainer's profile at Spiderfan.org
 Brief bio of Lady Ock at Spider-Girl fansite

Characters created by J. M. DeMatteis
Comics characters introduced in 1995
Marvel Comics cyborgs
Fictional female scientists
Fictional flexible weapons practitioners
Fictional mad scientists
Fictional physicists
Fictional roboticists
Marvel Comics female supervillains
Marvel Comics scientists
Spider-Man characters